Connor Theodore Hansen (November 1, 1913August 21, 1987) was a justice of the Wisconsin Supreme Court for 13 years, from 1967 until 1980.  An American attorney and Republican politician, he previously served as County Judge and District Attorney of Eau Claire County, and worked as a special agent of the Federal Bureau of Investigation during World War II.

Early life and education

He was born in Freeman, South Dakota, and was educated in the Eau Claire public schools, graduating from Eau Claire High School.  He earned his bachelor's degree from the Eau Claire State Teachers College in 1934 (now the University of Wisconsin–Eau Claire), and immediately went on to University of Wisconsin Law School, where he earned his J.D. in 1937.

Legal and political career

After briefly practicing law in Eau Claire, in 1938, Hansen declared his candidacy for district attorney of Eau Claire County.  Despite being only 24 years old, Hansen won the Republican Party primary election, defeating former district attorney Curt W. Augustine, and went on to win the general election, defeating incumbent district attorney, Progressive Victor O. Tronsdal.  Hansen was subsequently re-elected in 1940 and 1942.

A few months into his third term, however, he resigned as district attorney to accept a position as special agent with the Federal Bureau of Investigation. He completed his service with the FBI and returned to Eau Claire in late 1944, and formed a law partnership with his former assistant district attorney, John D. Kaiser.

In 1945, Hansen returned to public office when he was appointed circuit court commissioner for Eau Claire County by 19th circuit judge Clarence E. Rinehard, and would continue in that role until his appointment as County Judge in 1958.  He was elected to office as a member of the Eau Claire County Board of Supervisors in 1947, and would remain on the board until 1952, serving as chairman in 1949 and 1950.

He was a strong supporter of former Minnesota Governor Harold Stassen in his campaign for the Republican nomination for president in 1948, and was elected as a Stassen delegate to the 1948 Republican National Convention.  That same year, he attempted a run for United States House of Representatives in Wisconsin's 9th congressional district.  He fell far short of incumbent  Merlin Hull in the Republican primary, however.

Judicial career
Due to his role as circuit court commissioner, between 1945 and 1957, Hansen frequently served as acting County Judge in place of Judge Merrill R. Farr, when he was recused from cases or otherwise absent.  In 1958, Hansen ran against Judge Farr for the Wisconsin Circuit Court seat in the newly created 24th circuit, but lost badly in the April general election.  With Judge Farr vacating the County Judge seat, however, Hansen was appointed as his replacement by Governor Vernon Wallace Thomson, taking office in June 1958.  His appointment was overwhelmingly confirmed in the April 1959 election for a full term as county judge.  He was unopposed seeking re-election in 1965.

In 1967, President Lyndon B. Johnson nominated Wisconsin Supreme Court Justice Myron L. Gordon for a newly created seat on the United States District Court for the Eastern District of Wisconsin.  Following his confirmation in March, Wisconsin Governor Warren P. Knowles chose Judge Hansen as Gordon's successor on the state's highest court.  He was subsequently elected to a full ten-year term in 1970, without opposition.

Personal life and family

Connor Hansen married Annette Phillips Ferry in on June 17, 1939.  Annette was a great granddaughter of Jonathan Phillips, an early settler at Lake Mills, Wisconsin, and, at the time of the wedding, her family was known as one of the most prominent families in southern Wisconsin.  Together, they had four children—Annette, Peter, David, and Jane.

Justice Hansen died at Madison's University Hospital on August 21, 1987.

Electoral history

Eau Claire District Attorney (1938, 1940, 1942)

| colspan="6" style="text-align:center;background-color: #e9e9e9;"| Republican Primary, September 20, 1938

| colspan="6" style="text-align:center;background-color: #e9e9e9;"| General Election, November 8, 1938

11918

| colspan="6" style="text-align:center;background-color: #e9e9e9;"| General Election, November 5, 1940

| colspan="6" style="text-align:center;background-color: #e9e9e9;"| General Election, November 3, 1942

U.S. House of Representatives (1948)

| colspan="6" style="text-align:center;background-color: #e9e9e9;"| Republican Primary, September 21, 1948

Wisconsin Circuit Court (1958)

| colspan="6" style="text-align:center;background-color: #e9e9e9;"| Nonpartisan Primary, March 4, 1958

| colspan="6" style="text-align:center;background-color: #e9e9e9;"| General Election, April 1, 1958

Eau Claire County Judge (1959)

| colspan="6" style="text-align:center;background-color: #e9e9e9;"| General Election, April 7, 1959

References

External links
 
  (his wife)

County supervisors in Wisconsin
Wisconsin state court judges
Justices of the Wisconsin Supreme Court
People from Hutchinson County, South Dakota
University of Wisconsin–Eau Claire alumni
University of Wisconsin Law School alumni
1913 births
1987 deaths
20th-century American lawyers
20th-century American judges
20th-century American politicians